Güvenköy is a small village in the Ulubey district of Ordu Province, Turkey. The area is home to a high degree of hazelnut cultivation.

Villages in Ordu Province